I-Land (stylised in all caps) is a South Korean boy group reality competition series organised by Belift Lab, a joint venture between entertainment companies CJ E&M and Hybe Corporation.

Twenty-three male trainees participated in the show, of which seven were selected to debut as Enhypen in the show's finale on September 18, 2020. The winning contestants were Yang Jung-won, Lee Hee-seung, Ni-ki, Jake, Jay, Park Sung-hoon, and Kim Sun-oo; the first six members were decided by global ranking, and the seventh by producer's choice.

A second season, I-Land 2, was expected to premiere in the first half of 2022 featuring female trainees; however, on July 15, 2022, it was announced that would be postponed to 2023 in order to better organize the show.

Promotion and broadcast 
On May 14, 2020, Mnet released the first teaser video for I-Land and introduced the participating producers and mentors. Beginning on June 1, the contestants were revealed.

The show premiered on June 26 on the cable channels Mnet, tvN Korea, Mnet Japan, and tvN Asia (Asia-Pacific). It  via Mnet Smart, AbemaTV (Japan), Joox (Hong Kong, Indonesia, Malaysia, Myanmar, Thailand); on the Mnet K-POP & Hybe Labels YouTube channels and Rakuten Viki (worldwide except certain regions). The first part of the show ended on July 31. The second part of the show aired from August 14 to September 18.

A special episode, titled "I-LAND Special: The New Beginning", aired on August 7, with Hwang Kwang-hee, Apink's Kim Nam-joo, Momoland's JooE, vocal coach Kim Sung-eun and DOOBU as hosts. In addition to recapping the events of the first half of the show, the hosts previewed the second part, including increased participation of global viewers, more performances, and specials appearances by BTS and Seventeen.

BTS and Tomorrow X Together appeared as guests on the final episode, broadcast live with an earlier time slot, at 8:00 p.m. KST.

The set where the show is filmed is at 37.79°N 126.71°E.

Concept
Twenty-three trainees are brought to a complex (called the I-Land) in the middle of nowhere surrounded by a luscious green forest for 113 days. The trainees will live together in the three-floor complex with modern living spaces, gym, dance studios, item room (for storage), and individual practice rooms; however, only 12 contestants can stay at any one time. The others will be on the "Ground", a simple building with a dance studio and dining area, and will have to commute to and from the I-Land building every day at set times. The two living spaces are connected by a gate and stage, where their skills will be evaluated. A key part of the show's concept is that both the participants' and producers' votes play a heavy role, as they decide who stays in I-Land and who goes to the Ground. Although the I-Land only accommodates 12 trainees, the trainees may be dropped and demoted to the Ground and promptly be replaced by trainees from the Ground.

While the show primarily focuses on the trainees and producers votes, the audience can vote on who remains in the I-Land in the last part of part one of the show. Based on the results, any trainees in the Ground will be eliminated. From there, the I-Landers will compete among themselves in the second part of the series to determine who will debut in the final seven-member group. In the second part, only the producers and audience can vote. Thus, the show was originally supposed to focus on trainee and producer votes without much audience influence, but in part 2 of the show, the trainees did not vote at all, and global votes were introduced.

Actor Namkoong Min served as I-Land's official host, commentator and narrator. The contestants were evaluated by main producer Bang Si-hyuk, CEO of Big Hit Music, as well as South Korean singer Rain and rapper Zico, both of whom rose to prominence in K-pop and K-hip hop, respectively, in the early 21st century. Rain and Zico will also mentor the trainees.

A first in South Korean survival programs, Big Brother-style live cameras display multi-camera footage from inside the I-Land and Ground in a one-hour, video on demand segment called I-LAND Cam. New videos released every Monday, Wednesday, Friday, and Saturday on the Weverse app and its website. In the last week of the show, I-LAND Cam streamed live in real-time, every day for one hour starting at 6PM KST; on the final day, for the final episode, I-LAND Cams streamed live starting at 5AM KST.

Cast 
Storyteller: Namkoong Min

Producers: 
 Bang Si-hyuk
 Rain (Part 1 only)
 Zico (Part 1 only)
Directors:
 Pdogg
 Son Sung-deuk
 Wonderkid
 DOOBU
Guests:
 Hwang Kwang-hee (special host)
 Apink's Kim Nam-joo (special host)
 Momoland's JooE (special host)
 Kim Sung-eun (special host, episode 9)
 BTS (episodes 7 and 12)
 Bae Yoon-jung (episode 7)
 Seventeen's The8, Jun, Hoshi, Dino (episode 10)
 Shin A-young (co-host, finale)
 Tomorrow X Together (episode 12)
 Seventeen (episode 12, via AbemaTV Japan's I-Land K-pop Special)
 Eliminated contestants (episode 12)

Contestants 
Originally, there were a total of 23 contestants who participated in I-Land; however, as the show progressed, one contestant (Kim Yoon-won) voluntarily dropped out in the fifth episode of Part 1 due to a worsening ankle injury.

Color key:

Profile
The ages of all contestants are presented in accordance with the international age system as of Episode 1 (June 26, 2020).

Missions

Part 1

Entry test 
Trainees must perform a song either in the small groups in which they arrived or alone if they arrived as such. The contestants already present raise their hands to decide whether the new arrivals are worthy to be in the I-Land. If a trainee receives 12 or more votes, they are allowed to be on the I-Land; otherwise, they will be on the Ground. There is no limit to the number of times any one trainee could raise his hand. However, if more than 12 contestants were voted to the I-Land after the entry test is complete, they must choose one or more to be moved to the Ground until only 12 remain.

Color key
  I-Land
  Moved Out
  Ground

Theme song 
The trainees, who are only just getting to know each other, begin their first official mission with the theme "encounter". The I-Landers and Grounders must perform the show's theme song "Into The I-LAND" (original version by IU). There are 12 parts in the song, and each trainee picks which they want to perform. The I-Landers are evaluated individually by the producers and directors, and the entire group's average score determines the number of contestants who move out of the I-Land. The Grounders each submit a daily performance video to be reviewed by the producers and directors to determine who will replace the demoted I-Landers, although they do not actually perform on stage.

Lee Hee-seung is appointed as leader and assigned the part 1 position by the contestants but later gives up both to Ni-ki. Rain evaluates their performance two days before their performance. The I-Landers receive an average score of 59 and therefore choose six contestants to be moved out of the I-Land.

Color key
  Contestant from the I-Land later moved to the Ground

Teamwork 
The trainees' second mission is designed to test and develop their teamwork. Both the I-Landers and the Grounders must perform a remix of "Fire" by BTS, given six days to prepare. The scoring system from the theme song mission will be used; however, the highest individual scoring I-Lander is given a dropout exemption card, which can be used on any of the I-Landers, including himself. If the card is used, the next dropout candidate will automatically be demoted to the Ground. If there were no dropouts from I-Land in this round, the Grounders will not be able to perform at all.

Jay and Ni-ki become the leaders of the Grounders, while Lee Hee-seung is the leader of the I-Landers. Two days before the test, Rain and DOOBU evaluate the Grounders, and Zico, Pdogg and Son Sung-deuk evaluate the I-Landers as a midpoint check. The I-Landers receive a teamwork score of 80 and an average score of 78 and therefore choose four contestants to be moved out from the I-Land. Having received the highest individual score, K uses his dropout exemption card to save Yang Jung-won, and Ta-ki moves to the Ground instead. Both received five votes; however, Ta-ki's higher individual score initially saved him from being dropped.

  Contestant from I-Land that received the highest score thus received the dropout exemption card
  Contestant that eventually stays in I-Land
  Contestant that later moved from I-Land to Ground
  Contestant that later moved from Ground to I-Land
  Contestant that eventually stays in Ground

Representative Unit 
The trainees' third mission involves picking representatives for vocal and dance battles between the I-Landers and Grounders to test their sacrifice and ability to directly compete. If the Grounders win, six contestants will be dropped from the I-Land. If I-Landers wins, no contestants will be dropped. The trainees are given six days to prepare.

Rain and Son Sung-deuk evaluate the I-Landers, and Zico, Pdogg, and DOOBU evaluate the Grounders as a midpoint check, three days before the test. The I-Landers won the battle; therefore, no I-Landers are moved to the Ground.

  Win
  Lose

The Final 12 
The fourth and last mission of the first part of the show decides the final 12 contestants. The trainees must perform an original song titled "I&credible" with the theme "Awakening". Similar to "Into the I-LAND", there are 12 parts, and each trainee must pick which part they want to perform. They are given seven days to prepare.

Rain and Son Sung-deuk evaluate the Grounders, and Zico, Pdogg, and DOOBU evaluate the I-Landers as a midpoint check. Jay and Jake help the I-Landers with the details of the choreography, and Ni-ki helps the Grounders. From the I-Land, three contestants are voted out by the I-Landers themselves, and another three from the producers. Six trainees from the Ground, including the demoted I-Landers, are selected to fill the six remaining spots in the I-Land by the global fans through voting. The six remaining I-Landers automatically advance to the second part of the show. After the eliminated I-Landers arrive on the Ground, they must perform again with the Grounders, given three days to redistribute parts and prepare.

I-Landers K, Lee Hee-seung, Park Sung-hoon, Yang Jung-won, Jake, and Jay are saved from being dropped to the Ground and they will continue on the second part of the show.

  Contestants that later moved from I-Land to Ground

 Kim Yoon-won withdrew from I-Land due to a worsening leg injury.

Part 2

BTS Test 
The first test of the second part of I-Land and the final 12 contestants is performing songs by BTS. The 12 contestants are divided into three units, with each one performing a different song. BTS announced the mission themselves in a message recorded from the living room of the I-Land complex while the contestants watch from the lobby. The producers pick the contestant who will be eliminated based on individual scoring. The unit with the highest team score will be exempted from elimination; if the contestant with the lowest individual score is in the winning unit, the trainee with the next-lowest score will be eliminated. They are given seven days to prepare. Son Sung-deuk and DOOBU evaluate the I-Landers as a midpoint check.

Choreographers Bae Yoon Jung and Son Sung-deuk give a mini-mission, a freestyle dance battle, with those ranking first through third serving as leaders of each unit and choosing either their unit lineup or song.

The "Fake Love" unit ranks first. Ta-ki receives the lowest individual score but is saved from being eliminated as he is a member of the winning unit. Lee Geon-u, who places 11th, is eliminated instead. The contestants placing first through third based on individual scores earn the opportunity to spend one day of outside of the I-Land.

 Unit with the highest score and is exempted from elimination
  Unit with the lowest score
  Contestant that was eliminated
  Contestant that was originally eliminated but was saved by the winning unit's exemption card

Chemistry Test 
The second test of the second part of the show is about chemistry between the contestants and global fans. The contestants are divided into two units and must perform new singles "Flicker" and "Dive Into You". The eliminations for this round will be determined by global votes. The contestant who is chosen by the producers as first place will have their votes in the 24 hours before global voting ends doubled.

Lee Hee-seung, the first-place contestant, selects his song and unit lineup. Each unit has six days to prepare. Son Sung-deuk and DOOBU evaluate the units' performances, while vocal coach Kim Sung-eun evaluates the vocal performances of the I-Landers as a midpoint check. Jake was the I-Lander picked by the producers. The contestant who places 11th participates in the mini-mission and practice for the next test, the Concept Test, but does not perform for the producers.

 First place contestant picked by the producers
 Contestant that was eliminated

Concept Test 
The third test of the second part of the show is about concept performance and features a mini-mission to form teams. The trainees cover two songs by Seventeen, "Pretty U" and "Hit". They are given one day to practice. The8, Jun, Dino and Hoshi of Seventeen visit the I-Land to administer the mini-mission themselves, which was won by Team "Pretty U". Kim Sun-oo places first and selects his song and lineup for the main mission. The contestants are divided into two units to perform new singles, "Chamber 5 (Dream of Dreams)" as a refreshing concept and "Flame On" as an explosion concept. The producers choose the contestant who will be eliminated based on individual scoring.

Park Sung-hoon and Kim Sun-oo were appointed as team leaders. Ta-ki, placed 11th in global votes for the previous Chemistry Test, is eliminated. Kim Sun-oo replaces Ta-ki with Park Sung-hoon, and K replaces Park Sung-hoon as leader of "Flame On". Both units have five days to practice, and Son Sung-deuk evaluates them as a midpoint check.

K places first in the main part of the Concept Test, and Hanbin is eliminated by virtue of placing tenth.

  First place team (chosen by Seventeen)
  First place contestant

 First place contestant
 Contestant that was eliminated

Final Test 
The last test of the show will determine the lineup of the debut group, which will have seven members. The top six trainees will be selected from global votes, while one trainee will be chosen by the producers. The trainees perform a new single titled "Calling (Run Into You)" during the live broadcast. Son Sung-deuk and DOOBU evaluate the I-Landers as a midpoint check. The I-Landers will also get to film their own PR video, the duration of which is based on their ranking; trainees placed first, second, and third will have 60, 50, and 40 seconds, respectively, and the remaining will have 30 seconds.

The 13 previously-eliminated trainees return to the I-Land and reunite with the current contestants to practice their first song, "Into The I-LAND", together and perform it on live broadcast for the first time.

The debut group name is revealed as "Enhypen", derived from the hyphen (-) symbol, which implies connection, discovery, and growth. The final lineup consists of Yang Jung-won, Jay, Jake, Niki, Lee Hee-seung, Park Sung-hoon, with Kim Sun-oo as the producer's pick.

 Debuting contestants voted by global fans
 Contestant that was picked by the producers to be in the debut lineup
 Contestants that were eliminated

Results 
Color key:

Part 1

Part 2

Discography

Singles

System

Part 1 
A scoring system was introduced in Episode 2. Each I-Lander is evaluated individually and scored from 0 to 100. These scores are displayed anonymously, so any particular individual's score is unknown, and then averaged to calculate the team score. Based on the team score, a certain number of I-Landers be moved to the Ground and replaced.

In Episode 3, a separate "teamwork" score was also given and factored into the overall average score.

Global voting 
A global voting system opened after Episode 5 on July 24, 2020 at 12:00 a.m. KST and ended on August 2, 2020 at 12:00 a.m. KST. Viewers vote once per day for six contestants out of the total 23 that they wish to see progress to the second part of I-Land.
 
The second global vote started on August 1, 2020 at 12:00 a.m. KST, after Episode 6, and ended on August 2, 2020 at 12:00 p.m. KST. Viewers vote for six contestants out of the 16 Grounders, excluding the top six I-Landers, that they wish to see progress to the second part of I-Land. Every vote is multiplied by three.

Part 2 
The new system was introduced in Episode 7. Each I-Lander is evaluated individually and ranked from one to 12. The top seven I-Landers will wear a badge symbolizing the debut group, and the ranks can change after each skill test. Identical to Part 1, there are four tests; on each test, one or more contestants will be eliminated according to their ranks. In Test 1 and Test 3, eliminated contestants are selected by producers only, while in Test 2 and the Final Test, global votes from viewers will be added to determine the eliminated contestants and final debut lineup.

Global voting 
Another global voting system was introduced to select the seven debuting members. For the first part of voting, each viewer can vote up to two contestants per day from August 15, 2020 12:00 a.m. KST to August 29, 2020 11:59 p.m. KST. Votes for contestants who were eliminated during the voting period are disregarded.

The second part of voting started on September 5, 2020 and ended before the final episode on September 18, 2020. Viewers can select only one contestant per day. Votes for contestants who were eliminated during the voting period are disregarded.

Another voting period occurred during the live broadcast of the show's finale. Viewers can select only one contestant, and voting is only open for an hour.

I-Land score results

Color key
  Highest score that round
  Lowest score that round

Rating 
Some ratings have already been rounded off to one decimal place, as they are usually of lower ranks. Despite low domestic TV ratings, the international simulcast on online video platforms generated an accumulated 13.6 million views per episode.

 This show airs on a cable channel/pay TV which normally has a relatively smaller audience compared to free-to-air TV/public broadcasters.
 NR rating means "not reported".

Controversies 
 June 2020 : During shooting, the staff fell on the stage, and one of the performers had an arm fracture.
 On August 12, 2020, a staff of the cleaning service company of I-Land contracted COVID-19. Mnet cancelled all production and schedules of the show indefinitely while contestants and staff were tested for the virus. Filming resumed on August 17, 2020, after the production set was disinfected over the weekend; by then, most staff and all contestants tested negative for the virus, while other staff members were still waiting for their results.
 On April 14, 2021, BTS and their label Big Hit Entertainment (now HYBE) were sued for copyright infringement over the reality K-pop talent ‘survival’ TV series I-Land, on which BTS made a guest appearance. The suit was filed in California on Wednesday, April 14th, 2021 by Bryan Kahn, who the filing says “is engaged in the business of creating and producing television series and audio music”  Kahn claims that his idea for a similar show, Island Hip Hopping, was “stolen” to create I-Land. Also named as a defendant in the suit is CJ E&M America, the US-based subsidiary of South Korean Entertainment giant CJ E&M, with which Big Hit created the show. In the filing, Kahn claims that he came up with the idea for a television show called Island Hip Hopping and registered the treatment for the show with the Writers Guild of America East on November 15, 2013. Cited - Music Business Worldwide.

Aftermath 
 Enhypen debuted on November 30, 2020 with the extended play Border: Day One.
 Belift Lab created two spin-offs of the show, "Summer Training Camp" and "TMI Q&A", featuring all 22 contestants. The first spin-off premiered on September 25, 2020 on Hybe Labels' YouTube channel, and the second was uploaded on September 28, 2020.
 Hybe Corporation announced that they would launch the "Hybe Labels Japan Global Debut Project" to search for artists to debut as a group in Japan on January 1, 2021. Former I-Land contestants K, Nicholas, EJ and Taki became members of the new group, participating in the show &Audition – The Howling in 2022.
 On September 26, 2021, Hybe Corporation and CJ ENM announced the second season of I-Land, to premiere as I-Land 2, and applications opened immediately after the announcement. The second season will target female trainees born in the 2000s to form Belift Lab's first girl group. Global auditions for the second season took place in South Korea, Japan, Vietnam, Australia, Thailand, Taiwan, and the United States from October 24 to November 21, 2021.

Some trainees joined new agencies:
Hanbin joined Yuehua Entertainment
Lee Geon-u and Chu Ji-min joined Bluedot Entertainment
Lee Young-bin joined Keystone Entertainment
Noh Sung-chul joined Fantagio
K, EJ, Taki, Nicholas and Kyungmin joined Hybe Labels Japan. However, on May 31, 2021, it was announced that Kyungmin left Hybe Labels Japan due to differences in the direction of the debut project.
Jeong E-chan joined Hyple Entertainment
Jo Kyungmin joined MNH Entertainment
Some trainees debuted in new groups:
Lee Geon-u and Chu Ji-min (JM) debuted as members of the boy group Just B on June 30, 2021 under Bluedot Entertainment.
Hanbin debuted as a member of the boy group Tempest on March 2, 2022 under Yuehua Entertainment.
K, EJ, Taki, and Nicholas debuted as the members of &Team on December 7, 2022 under Hybe Labels Japan.
Lee Young-bin debuted as a member of a nine-member boy group Blank2y on May 24, 2022 under Keystone Entertainment.
Jo Kyung-min debuted as a member of 8Turn on January 30, 2023 under MNH Entertainment.
Some trainees opened social media accounts:
Choi Se-on opened a personal Instagram account.
Lee Geon-u opened a personal Twitter account.
Choi Jae-ho opened a personal Instagram account.
Jeong Jae-beom changed his legal and stage name to Jeong Echan and opened an Instagram account. Currently, he is part of the music producing team Youth.
Kim Tae-yong opened a personal Instagram account.
Lee Young-bin opened a personal Instagram account.
Jo Kyung-min opened a now inactive personal Instagram account.
Some trainees joined survival shows:
 Jeong Jae-beom / Jeong E-chan joined Mnet's Boys Planet.
Kim Yoon-won has returned to the K-pop dance crew Matchpoint Crew.
Some trainees have left their groups:
 Lee Youngbin has departed from the group, Blank2y on February 25, 2023.

Awards and nominations

Notes

References

External links 
 
 Belift Lab
 I-LAND at Rakuten Viki

Hybe Corporation
Enhypen
Music competitions in South Korea
K-pop television series
Reality music competition television series
Mnet (TV channel) original programming
Korean-language television shows
South Korean music television shows
2020 South Korean television series debuts
2020 South Korean television series endings